Marie Thibault (born 7 January 1998) is a Canadian rugby union player.

Thibault played for Club de rugby de Québec. She made her international debut for Canada against England on 18 November 2018 at Doncaster. In 2020, She signed for French club Stade Bordelais.

Thibault was named in Canada's squad for the delayed 2021 Rugby World Cup in New Zealand.

References

External links 

 Marie Thibault at Canada Rugby

Living people
1998 births
Female rugby union players
Canadian female rugby union players
Canada women's international rugby union players